Timothy Allen Harrell (born 31 October 1975 in Mowbray, Cape Town) is a South African professional baseball player. In the 1998 MLB Draft, Harrell was drafted in the 20th round (606th overall) by the Los Angeles Dodgers. He played minor league baseball from 1998 to 2002 with the Yakima Bears, San Bernardino Stampede, Vero Beach Dodgers and Jacksonville Suns.

International
Harrell represented his native South Africa at the 2000 Summer Olympics. In two games, he threw 13.1 innings, giving up 6 earned runs, including a 10 inning, 4 strike out performance against the Netherlands.

References

External links

1975 births
Living people
Baseball pitchers
Baseball players at the 2000 Summer Olympics
Inland Empire 66ers of San Bernardino players
Jacksonville Suns players
Olympic baseball players of South Africa
South African baseball players
South African expatriate baseball players in the United States
South African people of British descent
Sportspeople from Cape Town
Vero Beach Dodgers players
White South African people
Yakima Bears players